German submarine U-212 was a Type VIIC U-boat that served with the Kriegsmarine during World War II. Laid down on 17 May 1941 as yard number 641 at F. Krupp Germaniawerft in Kiel, she was launched on 11 March 1942 and commissioned on 25 April under the command of Oberleutnant zur See Helmut Vogler.

She began her service career in training with the 8th U-boat Flotilla. She was transferred to the 11th flotilla on 1 October 1942, the 13th flotilla on 1 June 1943 and the 3rd flotilla on 1 November.

She was a member of thirteen wolfpacks. She carried out twelve patrols, but sank only one ship.

She was sunk by British warships on 21 July 1944.

Design
German Type VIIC submarines were preceded by the shorter Type VIIB submarines. U-212 had a displacement of  when at the surface and  while submerged. She had two shafts and two  propellers.

U-212 was fitted with five  torpedo tubes (four fitted at the bow and one at the stern), fourteen torpedoes, one  SK C/35 naval gun, 220 rounds, and a  C/30 anti-aircraft gun. The boat had a complement of between forty-four and sixty.

Service history

First to sixth patrols
Her first six patrols were of little interest; being confined to the waters of the north: around Iceland, Greenland, Bear Island and Jan Mayen Island. In that time (September 1942 to July 1943), she was based at Narvik, Bergen and Hammerfest in Norway.

Seventh patrol
It was during this sortie that the boat could claim her only victim; the Soviet Majakovski, sunk by a mine on 5 August 1943, laid by U-212 on 31 July.

Eighth patrol
The submarine departed Bergen and Norwegian waters, on 11 October 1943. Passing through the gap between Iceland and the Faroe Islands, she headed for Newfoundland, docking at La Pallice / La Rochelle in occupied France, on 2 December.

Ninth patrol
Patrol number nine was U-212s longest, at 63 days.

She was strafed by an unidentified Leigh Light – equipped aircraft on 14 January 1944. The 37mm AA gun malfunctioned after just one round was fired and the barrel of a 20mm weapon burst. No damage was inflicted by the air attack on the outbound U-boat.

On 25 February 1944, she met  to transfer some radar detection equipment. Both submarines were caught on the surface by an unidentified Catalina flying boat. U-549 dived immediately, but U-212 chose to put up some resistance before joining her sister. The boat was not damaged.

She was also unsuccessfully attacked by an unidentified B-24 Liberator on 8 March while inbound.

Tenth patrol
If her ninth foray was her longest, her tenth and thirteenth outings were the shortest – three days each. They both started and finished in La Pallice.

This mission was also cut short; while sailing to interfere with the D-Day landings, the boat was attacked by two 57mm Tsetse cannon-firing Mosquitoes of No. 228 Squadron RAF. U-212 returned to base for repairs on 9 June 1944.

Eleventh patrol
The boat did not get out of the Bay of Biscay, moving to Brest at the end of her fourteenth effort.

Twelfth patrol and loss
She left France for the last time on 5 July 1944.

Forty-nine men died; there were no survivors.

Wolfpacks
U-212 took part in thirteen wolfpacks, namely:
 Boreas (22 November – 9 December 1942) 
 Eisbär (27 March – 5 April 1943) 
 Siegfried (25– 27 October 1943) 
 Siegfried 1 (27– 30 October 1943) 
 Körner (30 October – 2 November 1943) 
 Tirpitz 1 (2 – 8 November 1943) 
 Eisenhart 4 (9 – 15 November 1943) 
 Schill 3 (18 – 22 November 1943) 
 Rügen (15 – 26 January 1944) 
 Hinein (26 January – 3 February 1944) 
 Igel 1 (3 – 17 February 1944) 
 Hai 1 (17 – 22 February 1944) 
 Preussen (22 February – 4 March 1944)

Summary of raiding history

References

Bibliography

External links

World War II submarines of Germany
German Type VIIC submarines
U-boats commissioned in 1942
Ships built in Kiel
U-boats sunk in 1944
U-boats sunk by British warships
World War II shipwrecks in the Atlantic Ocean
1942 ships
Ships lost with all hands
Maritime incidents in July 1944